is a Japanese model and actress from Tokyo who has appeared in a number of television drama series and variety shows, as well as featuring in magazines including as a cover model. She is affiliated with the talent agency Space Craft.

Appearances

TV dramas
Jigoku Shōjo Episode 10 (2007, NTV) – as Mika Kazama
Keishichō Sōsaikkachō Season 3 Episode 5 (10 May 2018, TV Asahi) – as Naomi Kadowaki (Diet Secretary member)

Variety
Gekimote! Seventeen Gakuen (Jul 2009 – Mar 2010, BS-TBS) – Regular.
Kurashi no Sapuri! Shūgō! Suzuki Sanshimai (Oct 2011 – Jun 2012, BS Asahi) – Co-stars: Sawa Suzuki, Ami Suzuki.
Sunderu Hito ga Mitai! Sekai no Chō! Zekkei House (28 Dec 2013, TV Tokyo)
Sunderu Hito ga Mitai! Sekai no Chō! Zekkei House 2 (16 Jul 2014, TV Tokyo)
Chikyū 30,000km! Kiseki no Ie e: Sekai no Chō! Zekkei House 4 (22 Jul 2015, TV Tokyo)

Webcasts
Rinshō Hanzai Gakusha: Hideo Himura no Suiri Another Story 2–3 (released on Hulu from 27 Mar 2016, NTV) – as Mari.

Stills
Sundai Preparatory School (2005) – Poster.
Tirol-Choco Ichigo Musume Daihyō (2006) – Image girl.
Cecile Cupop (2007 –)
Avail (Mar 2014 –) – Image girl.

Advertisements
Tokyu Security (2006)
Pentel Slicci "Jinx 1" (2007)
Rohto Pharmaceutical Mentholatum Moist Tiara (24 Jul 2010 –) – Co-starred with Ayame Goriki, Mayuko Arisue and Anri Okamoto.
Central Nippon Expressway Company company advert "Sā, Kōsoku de Ikou!" (2012)
GREE – Grani Production social-network game "Kamigoku no Valhalla Gate" (2015) – Co-starred with Rena Takeda and Anna Tsuboi.
Kao Corporation Cape (2016)
McDonald's Japan – McShake Ripe Kiwi (2017)

Films
Intern! (5 Nov 2016) – as Sayuri Shiratori

Music videos
Monkey Majik "Aitakute"

Publications

Photo albums
Yuuna (26 Oct 2013, Wani Books)

Magazine serialisations
Nicola (Shinchosha)
CM Now (Genkosha)
Seventeen (31 Jan 2009 – 1 Mar 2014, Shueisha) – Exclusive model.
non-no (20 Mar 2014 –, Shueisha) – Exclusive model.

As a cover model
Tsūgaku Densha: Kimi to Boku no Heya (By Miyu, 30 Jul 2010, Cobalt Bunko)
Tsūgaku Densha: Kimi to Boku no Heya (Original work: Miyu, Illustration: Tsukishima Coral, 30 Jul 2010, Margaret Comics) (comicalized paperback version)

References

External links
 – Space Craft 
 – Ameba Blog 
 – Yahoo! Mobage 
 
 

Japanese female models
Japanese gravure idols
21st-century Japanese actresses
People from Tokyo
1992 births
Living people
Models from Tokyo Metropolis